Pyrococcus abyssi is a hyperthermophilic archaeon isolated from a deep-sea hydrothermal vent in the North Fiji Basin at . It is anaerobic, sulfur-metabolizing, gram-negative, coccus-shaped and highly motile. Its type strain is GE5 (CNCM I-1302). Pyrococcus abyssi has been used as a model organism in studies of DNA polymerase. This species can also grow at high cell densities in bioreactors.

References

Further reading

Cohen, Georges N., et al. "An integrated analysis of the genome of the hyperthermophilic archaeon Pyrococcus abyssi." Molecular microbiology 47.6 (2003): 1495–1512.

External links 

Type strain of Pyrococcus abyssi at BacDive -  the Bacterial Diversity Metadatabase

Archaea described in 1993
Euryarchaeota